

Zale

Zaneth

Zara

Zatanna

Zatara

Zachary Zatara

Zauriel

Zebra-Man

Zeiss

Zeus

General Zod

Zodiac Master
Zodiac Master is the name of a fictional character appearing in American comic books published by DC Comics.

The masked villain known as the Zodiac Master makes his presence known in Gotham by predicting a succession of disasters, all of which he has secretly orchestrated. Having cemented his reputation, he starts offering odds on the relative success or failure for the plans of various criminals, all in exchange for 25% of the take.

Zodiac Master in other media
Zodiac Master appears in The Lego Batman Movie. He is among the Batman villains recruited by Joker to take part in his attacks on Gotham City.

Ashley Zolomon

Ashley Zolomon is the estranged wife of Hunter Zolomon. She made her first appearance in The Flash (vol. 2) #197 (June 2003) and was created by Geoff Johns and Scott Kolins. She was with the F.B.I. when she met Hunter and they soon married. The two specializing in apprehending low-level costumed criminals until Hunter inadvertently caused the death of Ashley's father by mistakenly believing that the criminal they were after was incapable of using a gun, causing their estrangement. After Hunter's transformation into Zoom, Ashley replaced Zolomon as a profiler in Keystone City's police department and attempted to communicate with her ex-husband. When Ashley was hospitalized after a car accident, Zoom returned out of concern for her. Zoom is, apparently, still attached emotionally to Ashley.

Ashley Zolomon in other media
Ashley Zolomon appears in The Flash, portrayed by Tatyana Forrest. This version is Hunter Zolomon's mother on Earth-2, who was murdered by her husband James Zolomon (Hunter's father) in front of the young Hunter, resulting in their son eventually becoming a serial killer and then the monstrous speedster Zoom. Her original characterization as Hunter's love interest is seen with Caitlin Snow.

Hunter Zolomon

Zookeeper

Zor-El

Zilius Zox

Victor Zsasz

Tony Zucco

Zuggernaut

The Zuggernaut is a supervillain and symbiotic alien life form in the DC Universe.

The character, created by John Ostrander and Joe Brozowski, first appeared in Firestorm the Nuclear Man #69 (March 1988).

Within the context of the stories, the Zuggernaut crashes to Earth as a meteorite in Russia. It was found by, and bonded to, Matvei Rodor, a black marketeer. Rodor is in conflict with a corrupt Moscow prosecutor named Soliony and agrees to the Zuggernaut's offer of help in exchange for being its host.

Returning to Moscow, they attack Soliony, who has been interrogating Mikhail Arkadin. Arkadin summons Firestorm and escapes the jail to find the Zuggernaut threatening Soliony. The Zuggernaut is driven off when Firestorm burns impressions of his hand into their chest.

The Zuggernaut reappears a short time later and allows itself to be captured in order to get to Soliony. Again Firestorm intervenes, creating discord for both the alien and its host. Their fight with Firestorm is interrupted by Stalnoivolk, allowing Rodor to override the Zuggernaut's desire to fight Firestorm and chase after Soliony. They, in turn, are delayed by the Russian super-team Soyuz, allowing Firestorm to catch up and stop them. This results in Rodor being mortally wounded and the Zuggernaut withdrawing to find a new host.

Zyklon
Der Zyklon is a fictional character appearing in American comic books published by DC Comics. He was created by Roy Thomas and first appeared in All-Star Squadron #45 (May 1985).

The name Zyklon is a reference to Zyklon B, the poison used in the gas chambers during the holocaust. Zyklon was given the power to move at superhuman speeds by scientists of the Third Reich. His first mission was to aid his fellow operative Baron Blitzkrieg, in stealing the Liberty Bell. They were opposed by Johnny Quick and Liberty Belle (who were then members of the All-Star Squadron) as well as the Liberty Bell's night guard Tom Revere. Blitzkrieg proceeded to hurl Tom towards a wall. Johnny Quick attempted to catch him but was stopped by Zyklon. Tom died, and Liberty Belle swore revenge on Zyklon. The two Nazis then fled with the bell. The Baron wanted the Bell, because it contained strange energies. He intended to destroy Philadelphia, but his plans were disrupted by Johnny Quick, Liberty Belle, Hawkgirl and Flash. While the heroes destroyed his machine, Liberty Belle was struck by a beam of lightning which endowed her with her Sonic Pulse Power. The villains then fled.

References

 DC Comics characters: Z, List of